Mahaut of Artois also known as Mathilda (1268  27 November 1329), ruled as Countess of Artois from 1302 to 1329. She was furthermore regent of the County of Burgundy from 1303 to 1315 during the minority and the absence of her daughter, Joan II, Countess of Burgundy.

Biography

Early life

She was the eldest child (and only daughter) of Robert II, Count of Artois, and Amicie of Courtenay. Her paternal grandparents were Robert I, Count of Artois, and Matilda of Brabant. Her maternal grandparents were Pierre de Courtenay, Seigneur de Conches, and Perronelle de Joigny. She was the sister of Philip of Artois (1269–1298) and Robert of Artois (born 1271).

In 1291, Mahaut married Otto IV, Count of Burgundy. She became the mother of three children, including two girls who married kings of France.

Rule in Artois

Because of the premature death of her brother Philip in 1298, she inherited the County of Artois at her father's death in 1302, rather than her nephew Robert III (her inheritance being based upon proximity of blood). Although he repeatedly challenged the decision, her rights to the county were consistently upheld by the Parlement of Paris and the royal court. She was an able administrator and managed to defeat the many rebellions perpetrated by members of the nobility. Her senior administrator was the Bishop of the Roman Catholic Diocese of Arras, Thierry de Hérisson.

Regency in Burgundy

Upon the death of her spouse in 1303, he was succeeded by their daughter Joan II, Countess of Burgundy in the County of Burgundy. Since Joan II was under age, she acted as her regent during her minority. When Joan II married the future Philip V of France in 1307, Mahaut continued to rule the domains of her absent daughter until 1315.

Death

Upon the death of Mahaut in 1329, the county of Artois was inherited by her daughter Joan.

Issue
 Joan II, Countess of Burgundy (c.1291–1330), married Philip V of France
 Blanche of Burgundy (c.1296–1326), married Charles IV of France
 Robert of Burgundy (c.1300–1317).
Mahaut's daughters Joan II and Blanche, along with their cousin Margaret of Burgundy, all future queens of France, were implicated in the Tour de Nesle affair.

In fiction

Mahaut is a major character in Les Rois maudits (The Accursed Kings), a series of historical novels by Maurice Druon. Druon describes her as the poisoner of Louis X and his infant son Jean I, who is later poisoned herself the same way by her lady-in-waiting Béatrice d'Hirson, who originally helped with the King's poisoning. Allan Massie wrote in The Wall Street Journal, "Few figures in literature are as terrible as the Countess Mahaut, murderer and maker of kings." She was portrayed by Hélène Duc in the 1972 French miniseries adaptation of the novels, and by Jeanne Moreau in the 2005 remake.

Family tree

References

Bibliography 

Artois, Mahaut of
Artois, Mahaut of
Countesses of Artois
Countesses of Burgundy
House of Artois
Chalon-Arlay
French suo jure nobility
13th-century French women
13th-century French people
14th-century French women
14th-century French people
14th-century peers of France
14th-century women rulers

ca:Matilda d'Artois